Join the Dots is the fourth studio album by UK-based duo The Nextmen, released in 2009 on Sanctuary Records.

Track listing

Personnel
Songwriting
Dominic Betmead – composer
B. Ellis – composer
F. Hibbert – composer
J. Modesliste – composer
A. Neville – composer
L. Nocentelli – composer
Jerry Ragovoy – composer
J. Sutter – composer

Technical
Brad Baloo – arranging, engineering, mixing and production
Tim Debney – mastering
Alan Mawdsley – mixing
Joe Pilbeam – album artwork
Dom Search – arranging, engineering, mixing and production

References

2009 albums
The Nextmen albums
Sanctuary Records albums